Al Shindagha, sometimes spelled Al Shindagah or Al Shindaga, is a neighbourhood in the traditional centre of the city of Dubai in the United Arab Emirates. It has undergone major restoration works, to revive the historic area and its buildings.

From 1912 to 1958, the then ruler of Dubai, Sheikh Saeed Al Maktoum, lived in the area. His reconstructed residence in Al Shindagha is now open to the public as a museum. It is bordered by the locality of Bur Dubai in the south, and by Port Rashid on the west.  The Dubai Creek runs along the district's western periphery.

The Al Shindagha Tunnel serves as the northernmost connector between the localities of Bur Dubai and Deira.

See also
 Heritage Village Dubai
 Al Bastakiya Dubai: The Oldest Residential Area in Dubai

References

Communities in Dubai